"Best of Me" is a song by American singer and songwriter Alicia Keys. It was written by Keys, Andrew Hale, Helen Adu, Raphael Saadiq and Stuart Matthewman. Keys released two versions of the song, "Originals", produced by Keys, and "Unlocked", produced by Keys and Mike Will Made It, through RCA Records on October 28, 2021. The song serves as the second single from Keys' eighth studio album Keys.

Background and release 
Keys announced the song on social media on September 28, posting the single's cover art. In an interview with Entertainment Weekly, Keys commented that:
 Additionally, in November 2021, Keys released a lullaby version of the song on Sweet Dreams extended play.

Composition 
The song samples "Cherish the Day" by Sade. Rap-Up described the song as a "slow-burning groove" while Jon Pareles from The New York Times described it as having "steady, diligent beat".

Critical reception 
Writing for The New York Times, Pareles found that "the track is hypnotic and open-ended, fading rather than resolving, as if it could go on and on". In his review of the album, Liam Inscoe-Jones from The Line of Best Fit wrote that the “broody” song “conjures an ice-cold vibe through clattering, propulsive drums and a deep bed of whirring synths; it’s simple, but conjures one hell of a mood with it”.  He also commented that the remix version of the song “change[s] so little that you have to squint to spot the difference”.

Live performances 
Keys performed the song at Mercedes-EQ Concert Experience at Mercedes-Benz Manhattan on November 6, 2021. Keys performed the song at Apollo Theater for Sirius XM Small Stage Series. On December 10, Keys performed the song at Expo 2020 in Dubal, United Arab Emirates. Keys performed the song on Today on December 14, 2021.

Track listing 
Streaming
"Best of Me" (Originals) – 3:58
"Best of Me" (Unlocked) – 3:49

Music video 
Keys released a music video for the original version on October 29, 2021.

Charts

Release history

Notes

References 

2021 songs
Alicia Keys songs
Songs written by Alicia Keys
Song recordings produced by Alicia Keys